Mary, Queen of Hungary was the reigning queen of Hungary, 1382–95.

Mary of Hungary or Maria of Hungary may also refer to:
 Margaret of Hungary or Byzantine Empress Maria (1175–1223)
 Mary of Hungary, Queen of Naples (1257–1323), Queen Consort of Naples 
 Mary of Hungary (governor of the Netherlands) (1505–1558), wife of Louis II of Hungary and queen consort of Bohemia and Hungary; later, the governor of the Habsburg Netherlands